How to Be Alone may refer to:

in literature:

How to Be Alone (book), a 2002 book by Jonathan Franzen
How to Be Alone, a 2014 book by Sara Maitland
How to Be Alone: If You Want To, and Even If You Don't, a 2018 book by Lane Moore
"How to be alone", a 2016 poem by Donika Kelly

in other media:

How to Be Alone (film), a 2016 short film
How to Be Alone, a 2009 short film by Andrea Dorfman
"How to Be Alone", a song by Eulogies from Here Anonymous
how-to-be-alone.com, a photo/video project by Donari Braxton